Gay-friendly or LGBT-friendly places, policies, people, or institutions are those that are open and welcoming to gay or LGBT people. They typically aim to create an environment that is supportive, respectful, and non-judgmental towards the LGBT community. The term "gay-friendly" originated in the late 20th century in North America, as a byproduct of a gradual implementation of gay rights, greater acceptance of LGBT people in society, and the recognition of LGBT people as a distinct consumer group for businesses.

Businesses

Many businesses now identify as gay-friendly, allowing for a more diversified employee and customer base. The Human Rights Campaign works to achieve equality for gays, lesbians, and other marginalized minorities, and publishes a list of companies in relation to issues concerning LGBT people. Companies that are noted for gay-friendly work environments include Dell and Coca-Cola. Companies such as R Family Vacations, Manspray, Volkswagen, Ginch Gonch, and numerous others offer niche products and services for gay customers. Others, such as LOT Polish Airlines sends the message of gay-friendliness by offering travel to major gay destinations with a rainbow flag. Studies have shown that LGBT communities tend to favor gay-friendly businesses, even if the cost of a particular product or service is higher.

World 

The Pew Research Center conducted a survey in 2019 to measure levels of acceptance of LGBT around the globe. 

Researchers at the Williams Institute at UCLA released a report in 2021 after analyzing findings from different surveys to develop their own LGBTQ Global Acceptance Index (GAI).

The Spartacus International Gay Guide publishes the Gay Travel Index, a ranking of gay-friendly countries. Points are added to countries for anti-discrimination legislation, equal marriage, partnership and adoption laws, and LGBT marketing. Meanwhile, points are subtracted for anti-LGBT laws, HIV travel restrictions, religious influence, and prosecution, murders, and death sentences.

In 2021, the Spartacus Gay Travel Index featured a majority of Western European countries in the top 10 spots (Denmark, Malta, Austria, Sweden, Portugal, United Kingdom, and Spain), rounded out by Australia, Canada and Uruguay. The bottom 4 countries were Yemen, Iran, Somalia and Saudi Arabia with Chechnya being the overall worst-ranked region for LGBT people.

Spartacus also publishes a Gay Travel Index for US states, listing the 50 states plus the District of Columbia with the same criteria as the country rankings. In 2021, the top spot was shared by California and Illinois, while the bottom nine states were mainly from the Southeast and the Mountain states.

United States 

 Notes

See also 

 Anti-gay
 Homosocialization
 LGBT marketing
 Pinkwashing (LGBT)
 Pink capitalism

References

External links

 Human Rights Campaign, lobby group for LGBT rights

LGBT rights
LGBT terminology
Industrial and organizational psychology
LGBT and society